Alluvium is loose clay, silt, sand, or gravel that has been deposited by running water in a stream bed, on a floodplain, in an alluvial fan or beach, or in similar settings. Alluvium is also sometimes called alluvial deposit. Alluvium is typically geologically young and is not consolidated into solid rock. Sediments deposited underwater, in seas, estuaries, lakes, or ponds, are not described as alluvium.

Floodplain alluvium can be highly fertile, and supported some of the earliest human civilizations.

Definitions
The present consensus is that "alluvium" refers to loose sediments of all types deposited by running water in floodplains or in alluvial fans or related landforms. However, the meaning of the term has varied considerably since it was first defined in the French dictionary of Antoine Furetière, posthumously published in 1690. Drawing upon concepts from Roman law, Furetière defined alluvion (the French term for alluvium) as new land formed by deposition of sediments along rivers and seas. By the 19th century, the term had come to mean recent sediments deposited by rivers on top of older diluvium, which was similar in character but interpreted as sediments deposited by Noah's flood. With the rejection by geologists of the concept of a primordial universal flood, the term "diluvium" fell into disfavor and was replaced with "older alluvium". At the same time, the term "alluvium" came to mean all sediment deposits due to running water on plains. The definition gradually expanded to include deposits in estuaries and coasts and young rock of both marine and fluvial origin.

Alluvium and diluvium were grouped together as colluvium in the late 19th century. However, "colluvium" is now generally understood to mean sediments produced by gravity-driven transport on steep slopes, while the definition of "alluvium" has switched back to an emphasis on sediments deposited by river action. There continues to be disagreement over what other sediment deposits should be included under the term "alluvium."

Age
Most alluvium is Quaternary in age and is often referred to as "cover" because these sediments obscure the underlying bedrock. Most sedimentary material that fills a basin ("basin fill") that is not lithified is typically lumped together as "alluvial". Alluvium of Pliocene age occurs, for example, in parts of Idaho. Alluvium of late Miocene age occurs, for example, in the valley of the San Joaquin River, California.

See also 

 Alluvial plain
 Bay mud
 Braided stream
 Desert pavement
 Eluvium
 Hydraulic action
 Illuvium

References

External links 
 

Sedimentology